Holmesfield is a civil parish in the North East Derbyshire district of Derbyshire, England.  The parish contains 41 listed buildings that are recorded in the National Heritage List for England.  Of these, five are listed at Grade II*, the middle of the three grades, and the others are at Grade II, the lowest grade.  The parish contains the village of Holmesfield, the hamlet of Cartledge, and the surrounding countryside and moorland.  Most of the listed buildings are houses, cottages and associated structures, farmhouses, and farm buildings.  The other listed buildings include two medieval crosses, a cross dated 1619, a church, public houses, a former toll house, a milepost, and two milestones.


Key

Buildings

References

Citations

Sources

 

Lists of listed buildings in Derbyshire